Anthony Gerard Edward Noel, 5th Earl of Gainsborough KStJ (24 October 1923 – 29 December 2009) was a British peer.

Biography
Lord Gainsborough succeeded his father, Arthur Noel, 4th Earl of Gainsborough, in the earldom in 1927. He attended Worth Priory in Sussex. When World War II started, he was on his way to the United States so he attended the Jesuit-run Georgetown Preparatory School, then located in Washington DC. Returning to Britain in 1943 he was declared unfit for military service. When he was 30, the estate was free from debt and he moved back into Exton Hall.

Career
Gainsborough worked for Vickers Supermarine in Southampton.

Gainsborough served as chairman of Oakham Rural District Council, 1952-67 before becoming vice-chairman and then chairman of Rutland County Council, 1970–73.  As president of the Rural District Councils Association in 1965, he played a prominent role in opposing the Redcliffe-Maud Report's proposals for reorganising local councils which were implemented under the Local Government Act 1972.

Gainsborough was Master of the Worshipful Company of Gardeners (1967); President, British Association, Sovereign Military Order of Malta (1968–74); Knight of the Venerable Order of St John (1970); Chairman of the Hospital of St John and St Elizabeth from 1970 to 1980, and President of the Hospital from then until his death.

Personal life and death
Gainsborough married Mary Stourton (24 September 1925 – 30 December 2018) at the Brompton Oratory on 23 July 1947.  Mary was a daughter of Major John Joseph Stourton and granddaughter of Charles Stourton, 21st Baron Stourton, 25th Baron Segrave and 24th Baron Mowbray.  They had eight children together:

 Lady Juliana Mary Alice Noel (born 27 January 1949); married Edward Foljambe, 5th Earl of Liverpool, two sons.
 Anthony Baptist Noel, 6th Earl of Gainsborough (born 17 January 1950); married Sarah Winnington (of the Winnington baronets), one son (heir apparent to the title Henry Noel, Viscount Campden)
 Lady Maria Noel (born 3 February 1951); married with issue
 Lady Janet Noel (born and died 23 January 1953)
 Lady Celestria Magdalen Mary Noel (born 27 January 1954); married with issue
 Gerard Edward Joseph Noel (born 23 January 1955); married Charlotte Dugdale, daughter of Sir William Dugdale, 2nd Baronet. They had one son, and two daughters.
 Thomas Noel (born 9 March 1958)
 Edward Andrew Noel (born 22 October 1960); He married, firstly, Lavinia Jane Bingham, daughter of Comm. George Edward Bingham, but divorced with no issue. He later married Sarah Kate Yeats-Brown, great granddaughter of Montague Yeats-Brown. They have one son.

Gainsborough died in 2009 and was succeeded in the earldom by his eldest son Anthony.

References

1923 births
2009 deaths
People from Rutland
Councillors in Rutland
5
Anthony
People educated at Worth School
Knights of the Order of St John
Bailiffs Grand Cross of Honour and Devotion of the Sovereign Military Order of Malta

Gainsborough